Party Hard is an action stealth video game developed by Pinokl Games and published by tinyBuild for Microsoft Windows, OS X, Linux, PlayStation 4, Xbox One, and Nintendo Switch. A mobile port, Party Hard Go, was released for Fire OS, iOS, and Android. In the game, players assume the role of a serial killer who infiltrates several parties with the objective of killing all attendants without getting caught.

Gameplay 
If a player kills a person within other party-goer's sight, they are alerted and will call the cops, and if the NPC finds a dead body, they will call the cops, who put bodies in body bags. In addition to that, players can hide dead bodies in dumpsters and other concealed locations. Players can set traps, such as poisoning drinks, making speakers explode, destroying dance floors, cutting down trees, starting fires and short-circuiting electricity boards. Players also have limited use weapons like swords (with an area damage), bombs and stun grenades, which are collected from containers. One can also pick up disguises and other collectibles. Bouncers are present regularly, and if one spots a player, the bouncers will start to chase the player, resulting in death if caught. If a player keeps using a certain shortcut to escape the police and is able to escape, a person will block that shortcut so that no players can use it. Partying people are distracted most of the time, and a single player can take more than 2 to 3 people out in this manner before being detected. The police are ruthless, being very hard to escape from, unless the player knows the level very well. Special agents are called in if too many policemen are killed. If a player dies or gets arrested, the level can be continued by the remaining players, and all players will be revived when starting the next level. However, if all players are killed, this results in a failure.

Twitch integration 
The game integrates with the streaming website Twitch. Viewers of a live broadcast can trigger events within the game, such as SWAT raids or rampaging bears. The Twitch-exclusive events were later enabled for non-streaming players.

Plot 
Initially, you play as an unnamed man who is described as "a guy who just wanted some peace and quiet" who finds it difficult to sleep when there are active party-goers nearby. He decides to kill them all using a standard knife. There are five other unlockable characters, including a Ninja (obtained by clearing a level with no bodies found), Policeman (obtained by completing all the levels), Katie (obtained by escaping the police 5 times in one game; also the only person available on the Miami Beach level), the Butcher (obtained by killing 20 people), and Hinter (starts the game with). Each level takes place at a party with a different theme, interactive objects, and "special guests," who are people that you call to distract/kill party guests. The completion of these levels also unlocks the storyline, which focuses on Detective John West's detailing of the Party Hard Killings of autumn, 2000.

The story starts in the present with the inspector John West being interviewed, in the interrogation room, by a cop named Darius who asks him about the Party Hard killings of autumn 2000. His narration, as well as the game, starts in the year 2000, somewhere in San Francisco County with the killer, fed up of the noise and of a small neighbourhood party. He then takes a knife and a hockey mask to start a massacre into a BBQ house party somewhere in North Beach (Salinas, California according to menu map). After he was "done" with the party goers, he gets picked up by bikers who take him to ranch party in Bakersfield and after that leaves to Las Vegas via a shuttle bus to a casino party and rooftop party near Arizona.

Several months later, he reaches Bay City, Texas and boards a cruise liner heading from Trinity Bay to Florida, only for it burn down and sink near Miami, Florida as the killer watches, he also meets up with Katie (Detective John West's daughter) there. She follows his footsteps by attacking a beach party, either being forced into it by her by the killer, or as a way to join him on his killings, and according to Darius, was abused by John. The killer takes a party bus on Route 10 with Katie only to murder everyone on board. John West finds them when the party bus got stuck on the road after they killed the driver, but it was too late since the killer had already slaughtered his daughter, the killer was almost about to put himself in jail, until on the way through the forest he, somehow, left John West unconscious and cut down a tree, causing it to fall on the police car.

They end up crashing near Salina, Kansas at saw mill. After murdering everyone there, the killer fakes being a victim and escapes the scene by an ambulance. He murders his way through a rooftop pool party at Denver, Colorado and a Halloween party in Wyoming. After a campus party in Salt Lake City, Utah was hit, and finally ends up was a party in the San Francisco subway hosted by some of his fanatics where the detective sought to stop the serial killer.

In the whole final cutscene, the party hard killer is shown seated on the train platform after killing everybody in the underground, with John and Darius's voices speaking to each other in the interrogation room, showing that the interrogation was all going on inside John's head. John finally confronting him about the murders. Darius stating he never fought back against him, and that some part of him enjoyed killing party goers just as much he did. John arguing off and trying to state "he isn't like him." Darius starts to work him over, telling him to "let it go." The game ending with John saying "come on Darius, let's go home," and a clip of them in the underground, Darius putting John's 
policeman hat and his mask back on.

Reception 

Party Hard received "mixed or average" reviews, according to video game review aggregator Metacritic.

Sequel and spin-off 

In October 2017, a spin-off simulation game titled Party Hard Tycoon was released as an Early Access title on Steam. It involves managing and organizing parties in the Party Hard Universe. Gameplay involves choosing venues, planning out your layout, catering, entertainment, and figuring out how to keep your guests happy.

A sequel, Party Hard 2, was released in 2018 for Microsoft Windows, Nintendo Switch , PlayStation 4 and Xbox One.

References

External links 
 

2015 video games
Action video games
Android (operating system) games
Fiction with unreliable narrators
IOS games
Linux games
MacOS games
Nintendo Switch games
PlayStation 4 games
Single-player video games
Stealth video games
Video games developed in Ukraine
Windows games
TinyBuild games
Xbox One games
Video games about ninja
Video games about police officers
Video games set in 2000
Video games set in Arizona
Video games set in California
Video games set in Denver
Video games set in Kansas
Video games set in Miami
Video games set in Texas
Video games set in the Las Vegas Valley
Video games set in Utah
Video games set in Wyoming
Works about fictional serial killers